This is a list of all personnel changes for the 2010 WNBA off-season and 2010 WNBA season.

Retirement
The following players played their final season in 2009.

Front Office movement

Head coach changes

General Manager changes

Player movement
The following is a list of player movement via free agency and trades.

Trades

Signed from free agency

Released

Waived

Renounced
Atlanta Dream
Jennifer Lacy
Minnesota Lynx
Tasha Humphrey
Seattle Storm
Janell Burse
Tulsa Shock
Cheryl Ford

Training camp cuts
All players here did not make the final roster

WNBA Draft

The 2010 WNBA Draft was held on April 8, 2010 in Secaucus, New Jersey.

First round selections

References

2010 WNBA season